Zmicier Khvedarovich Zhylunovich (Belarusian-lacinka: Źmicier Žyłunovič, Belarusian-Cyrillic alphabet: Зьміцер Жылуновіч, transliterated from Russian: "Dmitri Fyodorovich Zhilunovich") (October 13, 1887 – April 11, 1937) was a Belarusian poet, writer and journalist, known under pen name Tsishka Hartny (Ciška Hartny, Цішка Гартны), and a political leader.

Life 
In 1904, Zhylunovich joined the Belarusian Socialist Assembly and took part in organizing Belarusian workers. He contributed to the newspaper Nasha Niva and helped in its distribution.

In 1910 and 1911 he went to his hometown to Kapil and participated in the work of local organizations Russian Social Democratic Labour Party, in editions of pamphlets magazines.

Zhylunovich became a member of the Belarusian National Committee which organized the First All-Belarusian Congress. When a split occurred in the Belarusian Socialist Assembly in 1918, he became a member of the Bolshevik Party.

He was the first head of a Soviet government in Belarus, the Socialist Soviet Republic of Byelorussia.

In 1924 he published a book "Slivers on the waves".

In 1937, during the Great Purge in the Soviet Union, he was arrested as an "enemy of the Belarusian people" and committed suicide in prison.

References

1887 births
1937 suicides
People from Kapyl
People from Slutsky Uyezd
Bolsheviks
Communist Party of Byelorussia politicians
Socialist Soviet Republic of Byelorussia people
Byelorussian Soviet Socialist Republic people
Belarusian male poets
Belarusian writers
20th-century Belarusian poets
Belarusian novelists
Belarusian politicians who committed suicide
Suicides in the Soviet Union
Soviet people who died in prison custody
Prisoners who died in Soviet detention
People who committed suicide in prison custody
Great Purge victims from Belarus
Soviet rehabilitations
Members of the Communist Party of the Soviet Union executed by the Soviet Union